Talorchestia is a genus of amphipod of the family Talitridae, containing the following species:

Talorchestia affinis Maccagno, 1936
Talorchestia africana Bate, 1862
Talorchestia antennulata Chevreux, 1915
Talorchestia australis K. H. Barnard, 1916
Talorchestia brito S.C. Gonçalves, 2003
Talorchestia brucei Lowry & Springthorpe, 2009
Talorchestia capensis (Dana, 1853)
Talorchestia cookii Filhol, 1885
Talorchestia dentata (Filhol, 1885)
Talorchestia diemenensis Haswell, 1879
Talorchestia fisheri (Milne-Edwards, 1830)
Talorchestia franchetti Maccagno, 1936
Talorchestia fritzi Stebbing, 1903
Talorchestia gracilis (Dana, 1852)
Talorchestia inaequalipes K. H. Barnard, 1951
Talorchestia kempi Tattersall, 1914
Talorchestia landanae Schellenberg, 1925
Talorchestia marcuzzi Ruffo, 1950
Talorchestia margaritae Stephensen, 1948
Talorchestia martensii (Weber, 1892)
Talorchestia mindorensis Oleröd, 1970
Talorchestia morinoi Othman & Azman, 2007
Talorchestia palawanensis Morino & Miyamoto, 1988
Talorchestia pollicifera Stimpson, 1855
Talorchestia quadrimana (Dana, 1852)
Talorchestia quadrispinosa (K. H. Barnard, 1916)
Talorchestia rectimana (Dana, 1852)
Talorchestia skoogi stebbing, 1922
Talorchestia spinifera (Mateus, 1962)
Talorchestia spinipalma (Dana, 1853)
Talorchestia sulensoni (Stebbing, 1899)
Talorchestia telluris (Bate, 1862)
Talorchestia terraereginae Haswell, 1880
Talorchestia tricornuta Shoemaker, 1920
Talorchestia tucurauna (Müller, 1864)
Talorchestia ugolinii Bellan-Santini & Ruffo, 1991

References

Gammaridea